Richard Napoleon Lee (1833 – 28 May 1876) was an English cricketer active in first-class cricket in 1852.

The illegitimate son of Richard Thornton and his housekeeper Alice Lee, he was born at Clerkenwell, Middlesex, in 1833. He attended St John's College, Oxford, where he studied law. Lee made what would be his only appearance in first-class cricket in 1852, when he played for the Surrey Club against the Marylebone Cricket Club at The Oval. He was a barrister at the Middle Temple by 1861.

Lee later moved to Sidmouth, Devon, where he was appointed the Income Tax Commissioner for Devon. He died at Sidmouth on 28 May 1876, having changed his name to Richard Napoleon Thornton in 1865 as a condition laid down in his father's will. At some point he married Margaret James, who predeceased him. The couple had four children, with their three sons Richard, Albert and Walter all playing first-class cricket.

References

External links

1833 births
1876 deaths
People from Clerkenwell
Alumni of St John's College, Oxford
English cricketers
Surrey Club cricketers
Members of the Middle Temple
English barristers
19th-century English lawyers